Anekes undulisculpta is a species of sea snail, a marine gastropod mollusk, unassigned in the superfamily Seguenzioidea.

Description
The size varies between 0.6 mm and 0.9 mm.

Distribution
This bathyal species occurs in Arctic waters off Norway.

References

 Gofas, S.; Le Renard, J.; Bouchet, P. (2001). Mollusca, in: Costello, M.J. et al. (Ed.) (2001). European register of marine species: a check-list of the marine species in Europe and a bibliography of guides to their identification. Collection Patrimoines Naturels, 50: pp. 180–213

undulisculpta
Gastropods described in 1979